William Kenneally (1899 – 13 September 1964) was an Irish politician. A native of Curradara, Villierstown, County Waterford, he was elected to Dáil Éireann as a Fianna Fáil Teachta Dála (TD) at the Waterford by-election held on 26 June 1952 which caused by the death of Bridget Redmond of Fine Gael. He was re-elected for the Waterford constituency at the 1954 and 1957 general elections. He did not contest the 1961 general election.

His son Billy Kenneally also served as a TD for Waterford from 1965 to 1982 and his grandson Brendan Kenneally is a former TD for Waterford.

See also
Families in the Oireachtas

References

1899 births
1964 deaths
Fianna Fáil TDs
Members of the 14th Dáil
Members of the 15th Dáil
Members of the 16th Dáil
Politicians from County Waterford